Ksenia Valentinovna Lykina (born 19 June 1990) is a Russian former tennis player. Her highest WTA singles ranking is No. 171, which she reached in April 2010. Her career-high in doubles is 108, which she achieved in February 2017. She is an Australian Open girls' doubles champion (2008), and a finalist of US Open girls' doubles (2007). Her best ITF junior ranking was No. 4 in the world.

ITF Circuit finals

Singles: 13 (6 titles, 7 runner–ups)

Doubles: 39 (15 titles, 24 runner–ups)

External links
 
 

1990 births
Living people
Russian female tennis players
Tennis players from Moscow
Grand Slam (tennis) champions in girls' doubles
Australian Open (tennis) junior champions
Universiade medalists in tennis
Universiade gold medalists for Russia
Universiade bronze medalists for Russia
Medalists at the 2009 Summer Universiade
Medalists at the 2011 Summer Universiade
20th-century Russian women
21st-century Russian women